These Things Happen is the third studio album and the major label debut by American rapper G-Eazy. It was released on June 23, 2014, by RCA Records in North America, and was subsequently released in the United Kingdom on July 21, 2014. The album features guest appearances from E-40, Jay Ant, and ASAP Ferg. Recording sessions took place from 2013 to 2014, with the production on the album that primarily were handled by Christoph Andersson & Dean Earls, Jay Ant, blackbear, Jordan Evans and Matthew Burnett, among others. Following the release, he began to embark his These Things Happen Tour, for the support of this album.

Critical reception

The album received mainly positive reviews. Pitchfork contributor David Drake noted how the record was "moody and atmospheric" throughout its production and G-Eazy's musicianship takes cues from Kendrick Lamar ("Opportunity Cost", "Downtown Love"), Big Sean ("I Mean It") and Dom Kennedy ("Tumblr Girls"). He added that G-Eazy's lyricism works best when he explores inward in response to the world around him and displays glimpses of humanity that should be more prominent, saying "While one does get the feeling that there’s a better album somewhere inside of him, These Things Happen shows promise."

Commercial performance
The album debuted at number three on the Billboard 200, and number one on the Top R&B/Hip-Hop Albums, with first-week sales of 47,000 copies in the United States. In its second week, the album dropped to number 26, selling 9,000 copies. In its third week, the album sold 6,000 more copies in the United States. In its fourth week, the album sold 4,898 more copies, bringing its total album sales to 66,800 in the United States. On April 4, 2018, the album was certified platinum by the Recording Industry Association of America (RIAA) for combined sales and album-equivalent units of over a million units in the United States.

Track listing

Charts

Weekly charts

Year-end charts

Certifications

References

2014 albums
G-Eazy albums